Tea Falco (born Teresa Falsone; August 11, 1986) is an Italian actress.  Her credits include Me and You, Sotto una buona stella and the television show The Young Montalbano.  In 2015, she also starred as Beatrice Mainaghi in 1992.

Falco was born in Catania, Sicily.

External links
 

1986 births
Italian film actresses
Actors from Catania
Living people
Italian television actresses